Mario Röser (born 23 December 1966) is a German former footballer.

Career

The defender spent his entire professional career with Carl Zeiss Jena, where he later worked as physiotherapist. In total Röser played 220 matches for Jena's first team. In 1988 he won one cap for the East Germany national team.

References

External links
 
 
 

1966 births
Living people
German footballers
German football managers
East German footballers
East Germany under-21 international footballers
East Germany international footballers
Association football defenders
FC Carl Zeiss Jena players
2. Bundesliga players
Association football physiotherapists
FC Carl Zeiss Jena managers
DDR-Oberliga players